The Last White Man is a 2022 novel by Pakistani author Mohsin Hamid. It is Hamid's fifth novel. The main themes of the book are love, loss, change, and identity. The novel belongs to the genre of Magic realism, and it is about a white man, Anders, who one morning wakes up to find himself changed to a darker skin color and a different, unfamiliar appearance. Soon, more people begin to experience the same changes, and society finds itself divided and puzzled with questions about race, privilege, loss, love, belonging.

References 

2022 novels
Novels by Mohsin Hamid
Magic realism novels